Griffin College, also referred to as Griffin Business College, was founded as a family-owned business college in Seattle, Washington in 1909. In 1986, Griffin was sold to Phillips Colleges, a national chain of 92 private schools. Aggressive expansion of the school coincided with accreditation renewal issues and eventually the college closed in 1993.

Copies of unofficial transcripts may be obtained by calling the Workforce Training & Education Coordinating Board in Olympia, Washington, at 360-709-4611, or online at www.wtb.wa.gov

References
  Retrieved on 16 September 2010

  Retrieved on 16 September 2010

Defunct private universities and colleges in Washington (state)
Educational institutions established in 1909
Educational institutions disestablished in 1993
1909 establishments in Washington (state)